Alien Invasion, also known as Earth: A Crap Sandwich, is a 2004 short film that was produced as an advertisement for environmentalist causes. The film was produced by Greenpeace and was played in movie theatres and on television.

It was produced for charity, and according to Greenpeace had no budget.

Characters
 Eddie Izzard as Brik
 Joseph McFadden as Zarg
 Jim Broadbent as Robin

External links
 Greenpeace: Alien Invasion

Advertisements
2004 films
2004 short films
Environmental films
Greenpeace
2000s English-language films